Doris Piché (born 14 October 1965) is a Canadian badminton player. She competed in women's singles and women's doubles at the 1992 Summer Olympics in Barcelona, and in women's singles and mixed doubles at the 1996 Summer Olympics in Atlanta.

Personal life
Piché and her husband Michael Bitten have two sons, Will and Sam.

References

External links

1965 births
Living people
Canadian female badminton players
Olympic badminton players of Canada
Badminton players at the 1992 Summer Olympics
Badminton players at the 1996 Summer Olympics
People from Abitibi-Témiscamingue
Commonwealth Games medallists in badminton
Commonwealth Games silver medallists for Canada
Badminton players at the 1990 Commonwealth Games
Medallists at the 1990 Commonwealth Games